Corrado Manili (died 1522) was a Roman Catholic prelate who served as Bishop of Bagnoregio (1521–1522).

Biography
On 20 September 1521, Corrado Manili was appointed during the papacy of Pope Leo X as Bishop of Bagnoregio.
He served as Bishop of Bagnoregio until his death in 1522.

References

External links and additional sources
 (for Chronology of Bishops) 
 (for Chronology of Bishops) 

16th-century Italian Roman Catholic bishops
1522 deaths
Bishops appointed by Pope Leo X